Robert Emil Sommers (December 17, 1837 – December 1, 1919) (later anglicized to Summers) was a sailor in the U.S. Navy during the American Civil War. He received the Medal of Honor for his actions during the Second Battle of Fort Fisher on January 15, 1865.

Military service
Sommers volunteered for service in the U.S. Navy and was assigned  to the Union sloop-of-war . His enlistment is credited to the state of New York.

On January 15, 1865, the North Carolina Confederate stronghold of Fort Fisher was taken by a combined Union storming party of sailors, marines, and soldiers under the command of Admiral David Dixon Porter and General Alfred Terry.

Sommers continued to serve in the Navy after the war.  He was appointed to the Warrant Officer rank of Gunner on 11 November 1873 and was promoted to Chief Gunner on 3 March 1899.  He retired, having reached the mandatory retirement age of 62, on 17 December 1899.  

He died on December 1, 1919 in Annapolis, Maryland and is buried in the U.S. Naval Academy Cemetery.

Awards
Medal of Honor
Civil War Campaign Medal
Spanish Campaign Medal

Medal of Honor citation
For The President of the United States of America, in the name of Congress, takes pleasure in presenting the Medal of Honor to Chief Quartermaster Robert Sommers, United States Navy, for extraordinary heroism in action while serving on board the U.S.S. TICONDEROGA in the attacks on Fort Fisher, North Carolina, 13 to 15 January 1865. The ship took position in the line of battle and maintained a well-directed fire upon the batteries to the left of the palisades during the initial phase of the engagement. Although several of the enemy's shots fell over and around the vessel, the TICONDEROGA fought her guns gallantly throughout three consecutive days of battle until the flag was planted on one of the strongest fortifications possessed by the rebels.

General Orders: War Department, General Orders No. 59 (June 22, 1865)

Action Date: January 15, 1865

Service: Navy

Rank: Chief Quartermaster

Division: U.S.S. Ticonderoga

See also

List of Medal of Honor recipients
List of American Civil War Medal of Honor recipients: Q–S
List of Medal of Honor recipients for the Second Battle of Fort Fisher

References

1837 births
1919 deaths
United States Navy Medal of Honor recipients
Foreign-born Medal of Honor recipients
Union Navy sailors
American Civil War recipients of the Medal of Honor
Prussian emigrants to the United States
Burials at the United States Naval Academy Cemetery